This is a list of destinations served by Swiss International Air Lines including those served by franchise Helvetic Airways as of July 2022.

It includes the city, country, and the airport's name, with the airline's hubs marked. The list also contains the beginning and end year of services, with destinations marked if the services were not continual and if they are seasonal, and for dates which occur in the future.

Map

Destinations

Notes

References 

Lists of airline destinations
Star Alliance destinations